Plevna/Tomvale Airport  is located  south of Plevna, Ontario, Canada.

It was established and built by Kathleen and Claudio Valentini in 1989 on a property previously owned by Edmund and Florence Weber, who farmed the property for 75 years. It is privately owned, and prior permission is required to land there. Tomvale is also the home of Tomvale Software, which produces Tomvale Ground School software, preparing pilot candidates for the Transport Canada and Federal Aviation Administration exams, as well as unrelated software. The name "Tomvale" is a portmanteau combining the names of the family.

Tomvale is situated on Farm Lake which is part of the Mississippi River system in Ontario. The north shore consists of twenty waterfront properties, some of which are owned by pilots who make use of the airport. Although a water aerodrome does not exist on the lake, aircraft may land on the lake and obtain some limited services from Tomvale. The waterfront community is accessed via Farm Lake Lane which is an easement over Tomvale property.  

Tomvale has a possible impact crater at the end of runway 05. It is adjacent to the North Frontenac Dark Skies Observatory, and the North Frontenac Heliport which is situated on land originally severed from the larger Tomvale property. The Ontario Ministry of Northern Development, Mines, Natural Resources and Forestry has maintained a both a weather station, (Plevna), and fire fighting facilities at the airport since 1992.

The airport UNICOM frequency is 122.8. The airport is fully lit with an ARCAL system on a different frequency. Weather information for the area can be obtained through the MNR Weather station, (website below).

References

External links
Official website
Tomvale Aviation Software
MNR Forest Fire Information Map and Weather Station Info

Registered aerodromes in Ontario